Louise Brown (born 1978) is an English woman and the first human born after in vitro fertilisation (IVF).

Louise Brown or Browne may also refer to:

Louise Browne (born 1952), Trinidadinian  cricketer
Louise Brown (historian) (1878–1955), American historian of Britain
Louise Brown (politician) (born 1980), Danish politician
Louise Brown (tennis) (1922–2003), Canadian tennis player
Louise Brown Verrill (1870–1948), American composer